Yadamari is a Big Village in Chittoor district of the Indian state of Andhra Pradesh. It is the mandal headquarters of Yadamari mandal.
Yadamari is suburban of Chittoor city.

See also
Budigipenta
Samireddy palli

References 
Educational Institutions:

SriSiridiSai E/M High school

Pragathi E/M High school

VishnuPriya School

Vivekananda Jr.College

Vidya Jr&Degree College

Villages in Chittoor district